The Nyangumarta people, also written Njaŋumada, Njangamada, Njanjamarta and other variations, are a nation of Aboriginal Australians from the northwestern coast of Western Australia. According to Norman Tindale, they are divided into two distinct branches, the Kundal and the Iparuka.

Language

Nyangumarta belongs to the Marrngu branch of the Pama–Nyungan languages, together with Mangarla and Karajarri.

Country
Together they encompass areas from the Great Sandy Desert south through to Eighty Mile Beach, including Pardoo Station, Wallal Downs Station and Anna Plains Station.

Present day
Most Nyangumarta people now live in Broome, Bidyadanga and Port Hedland, though they still regularly visit their country.

Native title

Their traditional ownership of this country was recognised in 2009 by the Federal Court of Australia.

Alternative names
 Njangamada, Nyangamada, Nangamada, Nangamurda, Njangomada, Njangumada
 Njangumarda, Nangumarda, Njangomada, Nyangumada, Nyangumata
 Njadamarda, Njanjamarta
 Ngapakoreilitja (northern name, "southern waters people")
 Ngardungardu (northern name, contrasting with Nganudu (southern Njaŋumada)
 Warmala (pejorative northern Njangamarda term for southerners)
 Kundal (name for northern coastal Njangamarda)
 Kundal and Waljuli Njangamarda (southern inlanders names for northern coastal Njangamarda)
 Kularupulu (name applied jointly to coastal Njangamarda and Karajarri)
 Iparuka (name used by southern bands)
 Ngapakarna (another southern endonym)
 I:baruga, Ibarga, Ibarrga, Ibargo

Notes

Citations

Sources

Aboriginal peoples of Western Australia
Pilbara